Presidential elections were held in Azerbaijan on 11 October 1998. The result was a victory for Heydar Aliyev of the New Azerbaijan Party, who won 77.6% of the vote. Voter turnout was reported to be 78.9%.

Results

References

Azerbaijan
Azerbaijan
1998 in Azerbaijan
Presidential elections in Azerbaijan